Tiger Woods PGA Tour 13 is a sports video game developed by EA Tiburon and published by EA Sports for PlayStation 3 and Xbox 360.

Game Modes
Tiger Woods PGA Tour 13 features a game mode called "Legacy Challenge," where players control Tiger Woods through various points of his life.

Features
Tiger Woods PGA Tour 13 used to allow players to team up with friends in an Online Country Club or to create their own. The Country Club allowed members to earn Status Points and Coins that can be used to play rounds on a downloadable course or to unlock Boost Pin packs for their golfer. The Country Club web site required to provide this functionality was purposefully shut down by EA to encourage upgrade to Tiger Woods PGA Tour 14 and is no longer available.

The Online Country Club featured stat breakdowns to allow members to compare themselves to other members. The Country Club also offered a tournament creation feature for members to compete for the title of Club Champion.

Reception

Tiger Woods PGA Tour 13 received "generally favorable" reviews, according to review aggregator Metacritic.

References

2012 video games
EA Sports games
Golf video games
Multiplayer and single-player video games
Kinect games
PlayStation 3 games
PlayStation Move-compatible games
Tiger Woods video games
Video games developed in the United States
Video games set in Australia
Video games set in Canada
Video games set in Greece
Video games set in the United Kingdom
Video games set in the United States
Xbox 360 games